When We Were the New Boys is the eighteenth studio album by Rod Stewart released on 29 May 1998. It was Stewart's last studio album to be released by Warner Bros. Records.  It produced the singles "Ooh La La", "Rocks", and "When We Were the New Boys".

Background
When We Were the New Boys was the first album by Stewart to not be released on vinyl. The tracks are mostly covers, such as "Cigarettes & Alcohol" by Oasis, "Rocks" by Primal Scream, "Hotel Chambermaid" by Graham Parker, and "Superstar" by the band Superstar.  Two ballads were included that were suggested by Elvis Costello: Ron Sexmith's "Secret Heart" and Nick Lowe's "Shelly My Love".

The album also includes "Ooh La La", a song recorded by Stewart's previous band the Faces.  The Faces' version of the song was originally sung by the band's guitarist Ronnie Wood; Stewart recorded the song for When We Were the New Boys as a tribute to the song's co-author, Faces bassist Ronnie Lane, who had died in 1997 shortly before the album's release.

Track listing 
"Cigarettes and Alcohol" (Noel Gallagher) – 4:03
"Ooh La La" (Ron Wood, Ronnie Lane) – 4:15
"Rocks" (Bobby Gillespie, Andrew Innes, Robert Young) – 4:45
"Superstar" (Joseph McAlinden) – 4:21
"Secret Heart" (Ron Sexsmith) – 4:07
"Hotel Chambermaid" (Graham Parker) – 3:49
"Shelly My Love" (Nick Lowe) – 3:38
"When We Were the New Boys" (Rod Stewart, Kevin Savigar) – 4:39
"Weak" (Deborah Dyer, Martin Kent, Robbie France, Richard Lewis) – 4:38
"What Do You Want Me to Do?" (Mike Scott) – 3:36
"Careless With Our Love" (Rod Stewart) (bonus track on Japanese release) - 4:28

Charts

Weekly charts

Year-end charts

Personnel 
 Rod Stewart – lead vocals
 Kevin Savigar – horn arrangements (1, 3),  accordion (2), Hammond organ (2, 5), keyboards (4, 7-10), bass (4), drum programming (7, 8)
 Jeff Paris – acoustic piano (6), backing vocals (6)
 Oliver Leiber – guitar (1, 2, 3, 6, 9), lead guitar (4), backing vocals (6), acoustic guitar (10) 
 John Shanks – guitar (1, 2, 3, 6, 8, 9), electric mandolin (2), horn arrangements (3), acoustic guitar (4, 5, 7, 10), electric guitar (4), slide guitar (5), backing vocals (6), harmonica (10)
 Michael Landau – electric guitar (4, 7)
 Jeff Baxter – acoustic guitar (4), pedal steel guitar (4, 6), electric guitar (7)
 Lance Morrison – bass (1, 2, 3, 5-10)
 David Palmer – drums (1-4, 6-10)
 Paulinho da Costa – maracas (1, 3), percussion (7)
 Caroline Corr – bodhrán (2)
 Jimmy Roberts – tenor saxophone (1, 3)
 Nick Lane – trombone (1, 3)
 Rick Braun – trumpet (1, 3)
 Andrea Corr – penny whistle (2)
 Eric Rigler – low whistle (8)
 Sharon Corr – fiddle (2)
 Richard Greene – fiddle (6)
 Suzie Katayama – cello (9)
 Steve Richards – cello (9)
 Daniel Smith – cello (9)
 Sue Ann Carwell – backing vocals (1, 3, 5, 7), tambourine (3)
 Jacki Simley – backing vocals (1, 3, 5, 7) 
 Richard Page – backing vocals (2)
 Will Wheaton – backing vocals (4)
 Dee Harvey – backing vocals (5, 7, 8)
 Lamont Van Hook – backing vocals (5, 7, 8)
 Fred White – backing vocals (5, 7, 8)
 Jeff Pescetto – backing vocals (6)

Production 
 Producer – Rod Stewart 
 Co-Producer – Kevin Savigar
 Additional Production – Chris Lord-Alge
 Executive Producer and Liner Notes – Rob Dickins
 Engineers – Barry Rudolph (Tracks 1 & 3-10);  Steve Harrison (Tracks 2, 9 & 10); Charlie Bouis (Track 4).
 Assistant Engineers – Greg Collins, Jim Horetski, Allan Sanderson, Rafa Sardina and Jeff Thomas.
 Mixed by Chris Lord-Alge at Image Recording Studios (Los Angeles, CA), assisted by Michael Dy.
 Mastered by Doug Sax at The Mastering Lab (Hollywood, CA).
 Artwork – Ed Fotheringham
 Art Direction and Design – Lawrence Azerrad
 Photography – Ken Sharp 
 Management – Annie Challis and Arnold Stiefel at Stiefel Entertainment.

Certifications and sales

Notes

References

External links
http://www.rodstewartfanclub.com/about_rod/disco/album_detail.php?album_id=21

Rod Stewart albums
1998 albums
Warner Records albums